Michele Tarallo (born 9 September 1980 in Nocera Inferiore) is an Italian professional footballer who is currently playing as a striker for Savona.

Career
Tarallo played 1 game in the Serie A for A.S. Bari in the 1998–99 season.

In the 2005–06 season he set a scoring record for U.S.O. Calcio in the Serie D with 36 goals in 33 appearances. In 2006, he was signed by Genoa and loaned to several clubs, including Padova, Monza and Pergocrema along with Danilo Russo and Paolo Facchinetti. In July 2009, Pergocrema completed a deal to renew Tarallo's stay. He was injured in December 2009.

In July 2010, he was signed by Savona.

References

External links
 

1980 births
Living people
Italian footballers
Serie A players
S.S.C. Bari players
A.C. Prato players
Rimini F.C. 1912 players
Calcio Padova players
A.C. Monza players
U.S. Pergolettese 1932 players
Savona F.B.C. players
People from Nocera Inferiore
Association football forwards
Sportspeople from the Province of Salerno
Footballers from Campania